HD 168746 is an 8th magnitude star in the constellation of Serpens. It is very similar to the Sun, a yellow dwarf star (spectral class G5V). It is not visible to the unaided eye, but is easily visible with binoculars or a small telescope. In 2000 a planet was announced orbiting it.

In 2019 the HD 168746 planetary system was chosen as part of the NameExoWorlds campaign organised by the International Astronomical Union to mark to 100th anniversary of the organisation.  Each country was assigned a star and planet to be named with HD 168746 being assigned to Cyprus.  The winning proposal named the star Alasia, an ancient name for Cyprus, and the planet Onasilos after an ancient Cypriot physician identified in the Idalion Tablet, one of the oldest known legal contracts.

Planetary system

The planet HD 168746 b was discovered by Exoplanet group at the Geneva Observatory with the radial velocity method using the CORALIE spectrograph on the Swiss 1.2-metre Leonard Euler Telescope.  At the time it was one of the lowest mass planets that had been discovered.

See also
 HD 168443
 HD 169830
 List of extrasolar planets

References

External links

G-type main-sequence stars
168746
090004
Serpens (constellation)
Planetary systems with one confirmed planet
BD-11 4606
Alasia